Victorino Fernandes (born 3 February 1989) is an Indian footballer who currently plays for Sporting Clube De Goa in the Goa Professional League.

Early career
Victorino started his footballing career at the age of 17 by playing for local amateur side Assolda-Chandor. However, the same year, Victorino joined local I-League side Salgaocar's youth team, where he stayed till 2010 before signing for Sporting Goa. He then got suspended by the Goa Football Association after it was found that he attempted to sign for Dempo while still contracted to Sporting Goa. While suspended Victorino played for Goa League 1st Division side Santa Cruz before finally signing for Sporting Goa officially.

Career

Sporting Clube de Goa
In June 2010, Victorino signed for Sporting Goa who were then playing in the I-League 2nd Division. After one season in the 2nd division, he helped his side gain promotion to the I-League after Sporting Goa finished as runners-up in the 2011 I-League 2nd Division.

Victorino started the 2011–12 season in the 2011–12 I-League with Sporting Goa. On 31 October 2011, he scored his first  and second I-League goals against Shillong Lajong in Sporting's 4–3 victory.  He then scored again on 19 November 2011, against Chirag United and then again on 23 November 2011, against Mumbai.

Fernandes helped Sporting qualify for 2014–15 Indian Federation Cup semi-finals. After trailing 1–3 against East Bengal in the last group game, Fernandes scored a hat-trick and helped the team reach semi finals. Victorino missed his teams' early I-League with injury.

FC Goa
In July 2015 Fernandes was drafted to play for FC Goa in the 2015 Indian Super League.

International career
On 19 November 2013, Fernandes made his debut for the Indian team against Nepal in an International friendly match at Siliguri, West Bengal.

Career statistics

Club

References

Indian footballers
India international footballers
1989 births
Living people
I-League players
Sporting Clube de Goa players
FC Goa players
Footballers from Goa
Association football forwards
Association football wingers